Cameron is a city in Clinton, DeKalb and Caldwell counties in the U.S. state of Missouri. The population was 8,513 at the 2020 census.

The Clinton and Caldwell counties portion of Cameron are part of the Kansas City, MO–KS Metropolitan Statistical Area, while the DeKalb County portion is part of the St. Joseph, MO–KS Metropolitan Statistical Area. The city as a whole is a part of the Kansas City-Overland Park-Kansas City Combined Statistical Area.

History 
In 1854, Samuel McCorkle platted the town of Somerville. When the Hannibal and St. Joseph Railroad (a line whose founders included the father of Mark Twain and which was to deliver the first mail of the Pony Express) proposed coming through the area, the line claimed the area around Somerville was too steep for the rail, so he platted a new community 1.5 miles to the west in what is now "Olde Towne" Cameron. The town platted in 1855 was named for the maiden name of his wife, Malinda Cameron.  McCorkle Park is still Cameron's centerpiece park.

During the 1860s, as fierce competition raged for the starting point of the First transcontinental railroad, there was competition to get the Hannibal & St. Joseph (which at the time was the farthest west railroad connected to the main rail network) to cross the Missouri River.  Omaha, Nebraska was to win the fight when the Union Pacific started the railroad west from there. However, there was no bridge connecting it to the rest of the network.

Kansas City, Missouri was able to convince the railroad to bypass its rivals in St. Joseph, Leavenworth, Kansas, Atchison, Kansas and Parkville, Missouri to create the "Cameron Branch" of the railroad. The construction of the Hannibal Bridge in Kansas City (which was to beat Omaha in any bids to cross the Missouri) was to propel that city into being the dominant city in the region.

Cameron was to enjoy a surge in its population because of the cutoff, with its population growing from 100 in 1859 to 3,000 by 1881.

Cameron was a college town from 1883 until 1930. Founded as the Cameron Institute, it became Missouri Wesleyan College, operated by the Methodist Church until 1930. A building on the campus would become Cameron High School (the Dragons) until being torn down in the 1960s, when a new high school was built on a site a few blocks south; the campus grounds are now used as parking for the nearby football field.

Cameron gained prominence in the 1980s and 1990s after Cameron area resident Bob F. Griffin served more than 15 years as Speaker of the Missouri House of Representatives—the longest of any representative. Among the pork barrel legislation he was to bring to the town were the Missouri Veterans Home and the Western Missouri Correctional Center, the latter of which is the city's largest employer, with 700 employees. A street in the town is named "Bob Griffin Road," though the road remains (as of June 2016) unpaved for most of its length. Griffin eventually served four years in prison for corruption.

Cameron's character has evolved with the intersection of limited access highways. It has expanded to the north towards and past U.S. Route 36 (which in 2007 was proposed to be part of Interstate 72). It has also expanded to the east towards Interstate 35.

Geography 

Unusual street grid
More than two thirds of the community is in Clinton County, south of NE Platte/8th Street/County Road 56. This area includes the original olde town center, Cameron High School and Veterans Home. The area north of the street in DeKalb includes the Crossroads Correctional Center and Western Missouri Correctional Center, and the shopping centers next to U.S. 36. In addition, portions of the community stretch east to the Caldwell County line. The north-south-east division creates an unusual street grid naming system in which some streets in the northern part of Cameron in DeKalb follow that county's naming structure of Southeast Rogers Road, Southeast Summit Road, Southeast Pence Road, etc. while roads in the south of Cameron in northern Clinton County have road names of Northeast 358th Street, Northeast 348th Street, etc. These latter street names and directions represent a continuation of the street system for Kansas City. With Caldwell County on the east side of Cameron, that means that street name extensions in Caldwell County on the far east side have a prefix of Northwest such as Northwest Old Highway 36. In one instance just outside the city limits, Southeast Oregon Road in Dekalb County becomes Northwest Oregon Road in Caldwell County when heading east from Cameron.

Climate

Cameron experiences a humid continental climate, with cold and snowy winters and hot and humid summers. Extreme weather, such as thunderstorms and tornadoes, can and have occurred in Cameron. Snow falls during the winter months, while late spring and early summer are the wettest time of the year.

Demographics

2010 census
As of the census of 2010, there were 9,933 people, 2,605 households, and 1,562 families residing in the city. The racial makeup of the city was 82.9% White, 14.8% African American, 0.5% Native American, 0.5% Asian, 0.3% from other races, and 1.0% from two or more races. Hispanic or Latino of any race were 2.0% of the population.

There were 2,605 households, of which 33.8% had children under the age of 18 living with them, 42.6% were married couples living together, 12.4% had a female householder with no husband present, 5.0% had a male householder with no wife present, and 40.0% were non-families. 35.0% of all households were made up of individuals, and 16.1% had someone living alone who was 65 years of age or older. The average household size was 2.36 and the average family size was 3.04.

The median age in the city was 37.4 years. 17.1% of residents were under the age of 18; 9.2% were between the ages of 18 and 24; 36.2% were from 25 to 44; 24% were from 45 to 64; and 13.5% were 65 years of age or older. The gender makeup of the city was 66.0% male and 34.0% female.

2000 census
As of the census of 2000, there were 8,312 people, 2,263 households, and 1,434 families residing in the city. The racial makeup of the city was 84.90% White, 12.64% African American, 0.60% Native American, 0.30% Asian, 0.25% from other races, and 1.30% from two or more races. Hispanic or Latino of any race were 1.37% of the population.

There were 2,263 households, out of which 33.5% had children under the age of 18 living with them, 48.3% were married couples living together, 11.6% had a female householder with no husband present, and 36.6% were non-families. 32.0% of all households were made up of individuals, and 16.2% had someone living alone who was 65 years of age or older. The average household size was 2.39 and the average family size was 3.03.

In the city the population was spread out, with 18.5% under the age of 18, 9.1% from 18 to 24, 40.2% from 25 to 44, 18.3% from 45 to 64, and 13.9% who were 65 years of age or older. The median age was 37 years. For every 100 females, there were 171.6 males. For every 100 females age 18 and over, there were 189.0 males.

The median income for a household in the city was $32,136, and the median income for a family was $40,540. Males had a median income of $29,529 versus $19,777 for females. The per capita income for the city was $12,375. About 9.8% of families and 12.0% of the population were below the poverty line, including 10.9% of those under age 18 and 19.2% of those age 65 or over.

Government
Cameron uses a council–manager form of government with a city manager appointed by the city council. As of February 2020, the current city manager is Steve Rasmussen.

Transportation

Highways 
 Interstate 35, exits 52 and 54
 Interstate 72 Proposed Extension from Current Western Terminus to Cameron, at I-35.
 U.S. Route 36
 U.S. Route 69

Education
Cameron R-I School District operates one elementary school, one intermediate school, one middle school, and Cameron High School.

The town has a lending library, the Cameron Public Library, with 35,000 items in its collection.

Notable people
 DeWitt Clarke Jennings, actor
 Don Gillis, composer and conductor
 Joseph Irwin France, U.S. Senator, representing Maryland
 George Smith, lieutenant governor of Missouri

References

External links
 City of Cameron
 Historic maps of Cameron in the Sanborn Maps of Missouri Collection at the University of Missouri

Cities in Clinton County, Missouri
Cities in DeKalb County, Missouri
St. Joseph, Missouri metropolitan area 
Kansas City metropolitan area 
Populated places established in 1830
1830 establishments in Missouri
Cities in Missouri